The GCC Champions League, was an annually organized football league tournament for club of the Arabian peninsula.

The 2011 edition was the 26th time that it has been organized.

The tournament has changed other the years, especially with the Asian Champions League taking up to four clubs from certain leagues meaning that this tournament generally no longer witnesses league winners participating but clubs invited to enter.

In this edition no clubs represent Saudi Arabia.

The Groups

Four groups of three teams.

Winners and runners up qualify for the quarter-finals.

Group stage

Group stage games are played on a home and away basis between March and May
Group winners enter a two legged semi-final stage

Groups

Group A

Group B

Group C

Group D

Quarter-finals

Semi-finals

1st Legs

2nd Legs

Al-Ahli advance to the final 2–1 on aggregateAl-Shabab advance to the final 4–3 on aggregate

Final

1st Leg

2nd Leg

Winner

Goalscorers

3 goals
 Hussain Al-Hadhri
2 goals
 Alaa Al-Zahra
 Fahad Al-Anezi
 Hashim Saleh
1 goal
 Leonardo Pisculichi
 Dawood Saad
 Yahia Kébé
 Ali Maqseed
 Yousef Nasser
 Hani Al-Dhabit
 Yousuf Shaaban
 Abdul-Aziz Haikal
 Ahmed Khalil

References

External links
Gulf Clubs Championship 2011

2011
2011 in Asian football